Frederic "Freddy" Mveng Mbezele (born 29 May 1992) is a Cameroonian footballer who plays as a right back and defensive midfielder for Biel-Bienne.

Career
Mveng began his career with Sahel FC and joined 2004 to Switzerland who signed for Lausanne Sport. After three years with Lausanne Sport, he left the team and signed on 12 August 2009 a contract for Neuchâtel Xamax. He made his debut in the Swiss Super League on 10 April 2010 against Grasshopper Club Zürich.
In May 2013 he signed a 3-year contract with FC Sion, but returned to Lausanne on 5 February 2014.

On 13 July 2022, Mveng joined Biel-Bienne on a one-season deal.

References

External links
 

1992 births
People from Maroua
Living people
Cameroonian footballers
Association football midfielders
FC Lausanne-Sport players
Neuchâtel Xamax FCS players
BSC Young Boys players
FC Wohlen players
FC Sion players
FC Biel-Bienne players
Swiss Super League players
2. Liga Interregional players
Swiss 1. Liga (football) players
Swiss Challenge League players
Swiss Promotion League players
Cameroonian expatriate footballers
Expatriate footballers in Switzerland
Cameroonian expatriate sportspeople in Switzerland